Bolshakino is a rural locality (a village) in Zabolotskoye Rural Settlement, Permsky District, Perm Krai, Russia. The population was 122 as of 2010. There are 40 streets.

Geography 
Bolshakino is located 36 km southwest of Perm (the district's administrative centre) by road. Aleksiki and Shugurovka are the nearest rural localities.

References 

Rural localities in Permsky District